Paul Bert (17 October 1833 – 11 November 1886) was a French zoologist, physiologist and politician. He is sometimes given the sobriquet "Father of Aviation Medicine".

Life
Bert was born at Auxerre (Yonne). He studied law, earning a doctorate in Paris; then, under the influence of the zoologist  Louis Pierre Gratiolet (1815–1865), he took up physiology, becoming one of Claude Bernard's most brilliant students. After graduating at Paris as doctor of medicine in 1863, and doctor of science in 1866, he was appointed professor of physiology successively at Bordeaux (1866) and the Sorbonne (1869). 

After the "Commune de Paris" (1870) he began to take part in politics as a supporter of Gambetta. In 1874 he was elected to the Assembly, where he sat on the extreme left, and in 1876 to the chamber of deputies. He was one of the most determined enemies of clericalism, and an ardent advocate of "liberating national education from religious sects, while rendering it accessible to every citizen."

From 14 November 1881 to 30 January 1882 he was minister of education and worship in Gambetta's short-lived cabinet, and in 1881 he created a great sensation by a lecture on modern Catholicism, delivered in a Paris theatre, in which he poured ridicule on the fables and follies of the chief religious tracts and handbooks that circulated especially in the south of France.

Bert was unexpectedly named resident general of the French Republic in Annam and Tonkin on 31 January 1886.
He left France in February 1886 accompanied by a dozen people including Antony Klobukowski, former chief of staff of Charles Thomson, and  Charles François Laurent, inspector of finances.
Bert died of dysentery at Hanoi on 11 November 1886.
After Bert's death Klobukowski and Laurent were listed among the subscribers in Tonkin to a fund to erect a statue in Bert's honour.

Works

He was more distinguished as a man of science than as a politician or administrator. His classical work, La Pression barometrique (1878), embodies researches that gained him the biennial prize of 20,000 francs from the Academy of Sciences in 1875, and is a comprehensive investigation on the physiological effects of air-pressure, both above and below the normal. Central nervous system oxygen toxicity was first described in this publication and is sometimes referred to as the "Paul Bert effect". He showed that oxygen was toxic to insects, arachnids, myriapods, molluscs, earthworms, fungi, germinating seeds, birds, and other animals. He also received the Cameron Prize for Therapeutics of the University of Edinburgh for this work.

His earliest researches, which provided him with material for his two doctoral theses, were devoted to animal grafting and the vitality of animal tissues, and they were followed by studies on the physiological action of various poisons, on anaesthetics, on respiration and asphyxia, on the causes of the change of color in the chameleon, etc.

He was also interested in vegetable physiology, and in particular investigated the movements of the sensitive plant, and the influence of light of different colours on the life of vegetation (photobiology).

He wrote a very successful textbook with Raphael Blanchard Éléments de zoologie G. Masson (Paris), 1885.

In The Phrenological journal and science of health (1883) it was claimed that  he held an atheistic belief

Racist theories

After about 1880, he produced several elementary textbooks of scientific instruction and also various publications on educational and allied subjects. Widely used in French schools for decades as the basis for scientific education, his book La Deuxième année d'enseignement scientifique (34th edition: Armand Colin, 1896) claimed that "European whites" are far superior and more intelligent than blacks, people from Asian, and Native Americans, among others.

He also actively opposed the granting of any political rights for the indigenous people in French Algeria.

See also

Notes

Sources

References

Further reading

1833 births
1886 deaths
People from Auxerre
Politicians from Bourgogne-Franche-Comté
Republican Union (France) politicians
French Ministers of Public Education and Religious Affairs
Members of the National Assembly (1871)
Members of the 1st Chamber of Deputies of the French Third Republic
Members of the 2nd Chamber of Deputies of the French Third Republic
Members of the 3rd Chamber of Deputies of the French Third Republic
Members of the 4th Chamber of Deputies of the French Third Republic
Governors-General of French Indochina
French atheists
French physiologists
19th-century French zoologists
French entomologists
École Polytechnique alumni
Academic staff of the University of Bordeaux
Academic staff of the University of Paris
Members of the French Academy of Sciences